Golovino is a rural locality (a village) in Gorod Vyazniki, Vyaznikovsky District, Vladimir Oblast, Russia. The population was 5 as of 2010.

Geography 
Golovino is located on the Klyazma River, 9 km east of Vyazniki (the district's administrative centre) by road. Maryino is the nearest rural locality.

References 

Rural localities in Vyaznikovsky District